Hebb is a surname. Notable people with the surname include:
 Bobby Hebb (1938–2010), American singer-songwriter
 Donald O. Hebb (1904–1985), Canadian psychologist

See also  
Hebbian theory in psychology (including Hebb's rule, AKA Hebb's postulate) 

English-language surnames

de:Hebb
ja:Hebb
zh-min-nan:Hebb
pt:Hebb